The Panorama City Special  is a pioneering streamliner dragster.

Believed to be the first "slingshot" dragster, the Panorama City Special (designed by hot rodder Mickey Thompson) had a full body, including skirted rear wheels, and a cockpit windshield wrapping around and over the driver. The steel front wheels were covered by lakester-style wheel discs (Moon discs).  The car debuted in 1955, at the first NHRA U.S. Nationals at Great Bend, Kansas. The wheelbase was only .

In its initial outing, it proved much slower than the competition, hitting only , when others were reaching almost .

Notes

Sources
Taylor, Thom.  "Beauty Beyond the Twilight Zone" in Hot Rod, April 2017, pp. 30–43.

1950s cars
Drag racing cars
Rear-wheel-drive vehicles